Hollow Coves is an independent band from Brisbane, Queensland, Australia. The band consists of two members, Ryan Henderson and Matt Carins, who sing and play guitar in folk style.

Members 
Ryan Henderson grew up without a musical background. When he was in high school, his friends took him to the Woodford Folk Festival to see the Folk and Indie pop group "Angus & Julia Stone." This music inspired him to learn the guitar and eventually to his career.

Matt Carins grew up in Brisbane surrounded by music. His father is in a local cover band and has written albums. His mother plays and teaches piano and flute. He also has a sister who plays the piano and a brother who is in an alternative rock band.

Carins has stated in the past that he was a carpenter and during the COVID-19 pandemic, he and Henderson built a production studio and soundproof "room" to practice and record their music.

Formation of Hollow Coves 
The pair recorded music in a garage that was uploaded just before they parted ways to Canada and England. The music became popular on Spotify in a very short amount of time which resulted in immediate fame and record deals. They decided to stay where they were living, but recorded and wrote songs long distance using online resources.

Officially formed in 2013, they released their first EP "Drifting" in October 2014 and now both reside in Queensland.

Awards 
At the 2018 Gold Coast Music Awards, Hollow Coves took home two awards: Breakout Artist of the Year and Song of the Year with "Coastline."

Discography

Albums 
 Moments (2019)

EPs 
 Drifting (2014)
 Wanderlust (2016)
 Blessings (2021)

Singles 
 Anew (2019)
 When We Were Young (2019)

References

External links 
 
 Spotify

Musical groups from Brisbane
Australian folk music groups